The 2016–17 San Jose State Spartans women's basketball team represented San José State University during the 2016–17 NCAA Division I women's basketball season. The Spartans, led by fourth year head coach Jamie Craighead, played their home games at the Event Center Arena as members of the Mountain West Conference. They finished the season 11–21, 7–11 in Mountain West play to finish in eighth place. They advanced to the quarterfinals of the Mountain West women's tournament where they lost to Colorado State.

Roster

Schedule

|-
!colspan=9 style="background:#005a8b; color:#c79900;"| Exhibition

|-
!colspan=9 style="background:#005a8b; color:#c79900;"| Non-conference regular season

|-
!colspan=9 style="background:#005a8b; color:#c79900;"| Mountain West regular season

|-
!colspan=9 style="background:#005a8b; color:#c79900;"| Mountain West tournament

See also
2016–17 San Jose State Spartans men's basketball team

References

San Jose State
San Jose State Spartans women's basketball seasons